Design Team One, Inc. is an Ohio-based design studio that was founded in 1981 as a subsidiary of the Cincinnati advertising agency, Northlich Stolley LaWarre.

History 

Based on growing public awareness that graphic design can be a powerful marketing tool, Design Team One was founded in 1981 on the subsequent premise that synergy between advertising (a client company's paid media: print, TV and radio) and its branding and graphic design would produce a combined effect greater than the sum of their separate efforts.

In 1985, board members Alex Stolley, Bill Lawarre and President, Dan Bittman purchased the company from Northlich Stolley LaWarre and moved its offices from the agency's building to the top floor of the city's historic Dixie Terminal Building designed by Frederick W. Garber. Design Team One was a destination studio on the IDSA (Industrial Designers Society of America) 1985 World Design Congress USA Tour.

In 1988, Bittman purchased Stolley and LaWarre's shares and became the studio's majority shareholder.

In 1994, Beverly Fox became an equal shareholder and in 2006 was appointed President & COO.

In 2011, Dan Bittman was awarded the AIGA Fellow Medal.

Scope and clientele 

Design Team One provides a range of graphic design services including corporate identity, print collateral (brochures, stationery, annual reports, posters), packaging, environmental graphics (exhibits, signage) and website design.

They have designed projects for many well known organizations, such as Chiquita, The Limited, NCR, Procter & Gamble, The Cincinnati Zoo, GE and NIOSH. They have also done pro bono work for organizations including Boy Scouts of America, John P. Parker Historical Society and Junior Achievement.

In 1995, the studio's work for the Cincinnati Ballet Company was honored by permanent inclusion in the Musée de l'Affiche de Chaumont and was selected for the UAI/UNESCO "World's Most Memorable Poster" International Traveling Exhibit.

References

Bibliography 
 “Dan Bittman” Communication Arts Magazine. May/June, 1984.
 Yasuku Kamakura/Ikko Tanaka (1988). World Graphic Design Now. Nippan Books.

Notes

External links 
 Festival Internationale de l'affiche de Chaumont
 IDSA International Design Conference
 American Institute of Graphic Arts

Graphic design studios
Companies based in Cincinnati
Design companies established in 1981